Club Chipmunk: The Dance Mixes is a music album by Alvin and the Chipmunks and was released by Sony Wonder. The album was released on October 6, 1996 and contains cover versions of popular pop/dance songs, and a Spanish version of "Macarena". The album peaked at #8 on Billboard's Top Kid Audio.

Track listing
"Macarena" (Los del Río) - The Chipmunks and The Chipettes
"Vogue" (Madonna) - The Chipettes
"Stayin' Alive" (Bee Gees) - The Chipmunks
"Play That Funky Music" (Wild Cherry) - The Chipmunks
"I'm Too Sexy" (Right Said Fred) - Alvin
"Turn the Beat Around" (Vicki Sue Robinson, Gloria Estefan) - The Chipettes
"Witch Doctor" - The Chipmunks
"Shout" (The Isley Brothers) - The Chipmunks
"Love Shack" (The B-52's) - The Chipmunks and The Chipettes
"Macarena (Spanish Version)" - The Chipmunks and The Chipettes

References

1996 albums
Alvin and the Chipmunks albums
Columbia Records albums